Cimolodon is a genus of the extinct mammal order of Multituberculata within the suborder Cimolodonta and the family Cimolodontidae. Specimens are known from the Late Cretaceous of North America.

Systematics
The genus Cimolodon was named by Othniel Charles Marsh in 1889. Kielan-Jaworowska & Hurum (2001) noted that Cimolodon seems to be more closely related to members of their "Paracimexomys group than to other ptilodontoideans.

Species
Cimolodon  electus (Fox R.C. 1971) is known from the Upper Cretaceous of the Upper Milk River Formation in Alberta, Canada. Possible finds have been reported from New Mexico.

Cimolodon nitidus (Marsh O.C. 1889) is known from Late Cretaceous strata of the Lance Formation of Wyoming, Utah, Montana and South Dakota (United States and Canada). Synonyms include Allacodon lentus (Marsh 1889); Allacodon rarus (Marsh 1892); Cimolomys bellus (Marsh 1889); Cimolomys digona (Marsh 1899); Cimolomys nitidus; Halodon serratus (Marsh 1889); Nanomyops minitus (Marsh 1892); Nanomys minitus (Marsh 1889); and Ptilodus serratus (Gidley 1909). Cimolodon pervus (Marsh O.C. 1892) is also known from the Upper Cretaceous Lance Formation of Wyoming. A specimen referred to as C. cf. nitidus has been recovered from the Prince Creek Formation.

Cimolodon similis (Fox R.C. 1971) is known from the Late Cretaceous (Santonian-early Campanian) of Alberta and Utah. C. wardi is known from the Wahweap Formation of Utah.

Cimolodon akersteni is known from the Cenomanian-age Wayan Formation of Idaho.

References

 Simpson (1929), "American Mesozoic Mammalia." Mem. Peabody Mus. Nat. Hist. iii (i), p. 1-235.

Ptilodontoids
Cretaceous mammals of North America
Prehistoric mammals of North America
Milk River Formation
Prehistoric mammal genera